Tourin is a type of French garlic soup, also known as le tourin d'ail doux, or 'smooth garlic soup'.  Many regions have their own variations on the recipe. Typically, many recipes include as many as 20 cloves of garlic for a much stronger flavor. However other recipes include an equal measure of both onions and garlic to even out the taste. To prepare, the minced garlic (and sliced onions if included) are sautéed until soft and a simple roux is made by adding flour. Chicken stock or water is added to the mixture and is simmered over low heat to reduce.  Egg whites are slowly drizzled in, not unlike egg drop soup, but whisked very rapidly to prevent large curds from forming. It is further thickened by tempering an egg yolk mixed with vinegar, which is then added to the soup.

See also

 List of French soups and stews
 List of soups

French soups
Garlic dishes